The pointing-out instruction is an introduction to the nature of mind in the Tibetan Buddhist lineages of  Mahāmudrā and Dzogchen. In these traditions, a lama gives the pointing-out instruction in such a way that the disciple successfully recognizes the nature of mind.

Terminology
In the Mahāmudrā tradition, pointing-out instruction is also referred to as "pointing out the nature of mind", "pointing out transmission", or "introduction to the nature of mind". In the Dzogchen tradition, the pointing out instructions are often called the “introduction to awareness” or "sems khrid," pronounced "sem tri". Senior Shambhala Buddhist teacher Jeremy Hayward describes this as

In the Mahāmudrā tradition, the mind pointed out is called "ordinary mind" ( tamel gyi shépa, Sanskrit: *prākṛita-jñana). As the Dzogchen Ponlop Rinpoche explains,

In the Dzogchen tradition, knowledge of the basis pointed out is called rigpa (Sanskrit: *vidya).

Sometimes the pointing-out instruction is referred to as "the empowerment of vajra wisdom," "vajrayana transmission" or "esoteric transmission," although these terms can also be applied to formal abhiṣeka as well.

Mahāmudrā
As scholar David Jackson describes, the particular Kagyu tradition of pointing-out instruction outside the tantras was popularized, if not originated, by Gampopa.

Jackson reports that, according to a number of Kagyu historians, Gampopa put particular emphasis on pointing out the nature of Mind. Jackson writes 

There is evidence that this practice derived from (unacknowledged) Chan influence, a controversial issue in Tibet. As scholar Matthew Kapstein writes, the 

The mahāmudrā tradition also includes a "fourfold pointing-out instructions" (pointing out the nature of Mind on the basis of appearances) presented by Karmapa Wangchuk Dorje in his three texts on mahāmudrā.

Dzogchen

In Dzogchen tradition, pointing-out instruction is also referred to as "pointing out the nature of mind", "pointing out transmission", or "introduction to the nature of mind". The pointing-out instruction (ngo sprod) is an introduction to the nature of mind. A lama gives the pointing-out instruction in such a way that the disciple successfully recognizes the nature of mind.

Efficacy
According to Dzogchen master Tulku Urgyen Rinpoche, "Once one has received the pointing-out instruction there is the chance of either recognizing it or not."

Bruce Newman, a long-time student of Tulku Urgyen's son, Chökyi Nyima Rinpoche, describes the possible responses of the student to the pointing out instruction:

According to Orgyen Tobgyal Rinpoche, few contemporary disciples are capable of recognition, even when receiving pointing out instructions from superior masters:

The Dzogchen Ponlop Rinpoche characterizes recognition as follows:

Secrecy
This conspicuous aspect of Vajrayana Buddhism is esoteric.  In this context esoteric means that the transmission of certain accelerating factors only occurs directly from teacher to student during an initiation and cannot be simply learned from a book. The term adhisthana (literally "blessing") refers to the spiritual energy that is received in the mindstream of the aspirant when successful transmission takes place.

Many techniques are also commonly said to be secret, but some Vajrayana teachers have responded that the secrecy itself is not important but only a side-effect of the reality that the techniques have no validity outside the teacher-student lineage.  As these techniques are said to be highly effective, when not practiced properly, the practitioner can be harmed physically and mentally. In order to avoid these kind of dangers, the practice is kept secret.

According to the Dalai Lama in The Gelug/Kagyü Tradition of Mahamudra:

See also
 Esoteric transmission
 Subitism

References

Citations

Works cited

Tantric practices
Dzogchen practices
Shentong